White chocolate is a confection.

White chocolate can refer to:
 
 Jason Williams (basketball, born 1975), basketball player who is nicknamed "White Chocolate"
 A variant of the LG Chocolate series
 "White Choco", a 2007 song by Ai Otsuka
 "White Chocolate Farm", a nickname for British singer Thom Yorke.

See also
White (disambiguation)